Sutjeska (Serbian Cyrillic: Сутјеска) is a village in Serbia. It is situated in the Sečanj municipality, in the Central Banat District, Vojvodina province. The village has a Serb ethnic majority (60.21%) and a sizable Romanian minority (28.26%) and a population of 1,737 people (2002 census).

Name
In Serbian the village is known as Sutjeska / Сутјеска (formerly also Sarča / Сарча), in Romanian as Sărcia, in Hungarian as Szárcsa, and in German as Sartscha.

Historical population
1961: 2,752
1971: 2,450
1981: 2,145
1991: 1,976

See also
List of places in Serbia
List of cities, towns and villages in Vojvodina

References
Slobodan Ćurčić, Broj stanovnika Vojvodine, Novi Sad, 1996.

Gallery

Populated places in Serbian Banat